Hargalan (also Romanized as Hargalān and Har Golān) is a village in Kuhestan Rural District of Qaleh Chay District, Ajab Shir County, East Azerbaijan province, Iran. At the 2006 census, its population was 3,494 in 756 households. The following census in 2011 counted 3,152 people in 833 households. The latest census in 2016 showed a population of 3,371 people in 955 households; it was the largest village in its rural district.

References 

Ajab Shir County

Populated places in East Azerbaijan Province

Populated places in Ajab Shir County